William James Herder (1849–1922), publisher, born Old Perlican, Newfoundland Colony, was the founder of Newfoundland's first daily newspaper, The Evening Telegram.

Herder was educated at Methodist Academy and in 1863 had apprenticed as a printer for the Courier.  When the Courier experienced financial difficulties Herder had bought it and in 1872 began the Evening Telegram.  Herder also started the Advertisers Gazette in 1883, which experienced limited success.

Herder was an avid sports fan, as evident with the participation of many of the Herder family, that in 1935 the Evening Telegram donated the Herder Memorial Trophy to Newfoundland and Labrador Senior Hockey League for the winning team.

See also

 List of people of Newfoundland and Labrador

External links
 History of Telegram
 Heritage Magazine PDF file.
 Junior Achievement of Newfoundland and Labrador Biography
 Herder Memorial Trophy History

1849 births
1922 deaths
People from Newfoundland (island)
Pre-Confederation Newfoundland and Labrador people
Journalists from Newfoundland and Labrador